The Robert Burns Humanitarian Award is an award presented annually around the time of Robert Burns' birthday to a group or individual who has saved, improved or enriched the lives of others or society as a whole, through self-sacrifice, selfless service, hands-on charitable or volunteer work, or other acts.

The winner receives a 1759 guinea, which signifies the year of the bard's birth and the coinage then in circulation, and a specially commissioned award handcrafted in Scotland.

The judging panel is chaired by David Anderson, chief executive of South Ayrshire Council, and includes journalist and broadcaster Kaye Adams; actor, writer and painter John Cairney; Nat Edwards, director of the Robert Burns Birthplace Museum; Habib Malik, former RBHA winner and head of Islamic Relief Scotland; Robert Stewart, president of the Robert Burns World Federation; Guy Willoughby, former RBHA winner and chief executive of the HALO Trust; and Rob Woodward, chief executive of STV.

Award recipients

2002: John E. Sulston
2003: Yitzhak Frankenthal
2004: Clive Stafford Smith
2005: Pius Ncube
2006: Marla Ruzicka
2007: Adi Roche
2008: Jonathan Kaplan
2009: Guy Willoughby
2010: Habib Malik
2011: Linda Norgrove
2012: Karen Graham
2013: Khalil Dale OBE
2016: David Nott, surgeon
2017: Marcelline Budza
2018: Anna Ferrer [Anna was born in Essex and has worked in India since the mid-1960s. She was recognised for her decades of dedication and devotion to women's rights and tackling poverty in her adopted homeland.]
2019: Jasvinder Sanghera CBE
2020: Josh Littlejohn MBE
2021: Mark Williamson (Sweet for Addicts)
From 2014, a new young persons' element was introduced: the Robert Burns Humanitarian Medal, for people aged 16-25 years from anywhere in the world.

References

External links
Robert Burns Humanitarian Award

Awards established in 2002
Humanitarian and service awards
Robert Burns
2002 establishments in Scotland